Coeliades rama is a butterfly in the family Hesperiidae. It is found in Madagascar. The habitat consists of forests, forest margins and anthropogenic environments.

References

Butterflies described in 1937
Coeliadinae